The 2002 United States Senate election in Iowa was held on November 5, 2002. Incumbent Democratic U.S. Senator Tom Harkin sought re-election to a fourth term in office. Harkin was opposed in the general election by U.S. Congressman Greg Ganske, who fought off a difficult challenger in the Republican primary. Though Harkin narrowly defeated his opponent six years earlier, he was able to defeat Ganske by a comfortable margin to win re-election.

Democratic primary

Candidates
 Tom Harkin, incumbent United States Senator

Results

Republican primary

Candidates
 Greg Ganske, U.S. Representative
 Bill Salier, hog farmer

Results

General election

Debates
Complete video of debate, October 6, 2002

Predictions

Polling

Results

See also
 2002 United States Senate elections

Notes

References

Iowa
2002
2002 Iowa elections